Grindelia greenmanii is a North American species of flowering plants in the family Asteraceae. It is native to northeastern Mexico, found in the States of Coahuila, Nuevo León, and Tamaulipas.

References

greenmanii
Flora of Northeastern Mexico
Plants described in 1934